Brisbane Street may refer to:
Brisbane Street, Hobart, Australia
Brisbane Street, Perth, Australia